St Annes-on-the-Sea railway station serves the town of St Annes-on-the Sea, commonly known as St Annes, which is part of the conurbation of Lytham St Annes in Lancashire, England.

History
The first station to serve the area was opened in 1863 as Cross Slack. It was resited to the present station which opened on 1 November 1873 It was renamed St Annes-on-the-Sea two years later. The station lost its Up Side platform in 1986 (although this is still visible), when the line from Kirkham was reduced to single track (the line west of here had previously been singled in May 1982) and most of the station was demolished. A new, smaller building was erected to house a ticket office, staffed on a part-time basis, which was officially opened in September 1986 by the Area Passenger Manager.

The station is currently served by the Northern East Lancashire Line trains between Blackpool South and Colne.

Facilities
The station has a ticket office which is staffed from the morning peak until early afternoon six days per week. At other times, tickets can be purchased from a vending machine near the entrance (which can also be used to collect pre-paid tickets). Train running information is available via digital display screens, telephone and timetable posters whilst there is a waiting shelter and bench seating on the platform. Step-free access is available from the adjacent street.

Services
From Monday to Saturday, there is generally an hourly service westbound to Blackpool South and eastbound to Preston (and beyond to Blackburn and Colne on Sunday only). The one daily service from St Annes to Manchester Piccadilly was withdrawn at the end of the 2007–08 timetable.

References

Notes

Sources

External links

Lytham St Annes
Railway stations in the Borough of Fylde
DfT Category E stations
Former Preston and Wyre Joint Railway stations
Railway stations in Great Britain opened in 1876
Northern franchise railway stations
1876 establishments in England